Foxtail millet, scientific name Setaria italica (synonym Panicum italicum L.), is an annual grass grown for human food. It is the second-most widely planted species of millet, and the most grown millet species in Asia. The oldest evidence of foxtail millet cultivation was found along the ancient course of the Yellow River in Cishan, China, carbon dated to be from around 8,000 years before present. Foxtail millet has also been grown in India since antiquity.

Other names for the species include dwarf setaria, foxtail bristle-grass, giant setaria, green foxtail, Italian millet, German millet, and Hungarian millet.

Description

Seed color varies greatly between varieties.

Names 
Names for foxtail millet in other languages spoken in the countries where it is cultivated include:





Gurung : Tohro
 or 

  
 or 
. The grain obtained from it is called jopsal (좁쌀), a word that is commonly used in Korean as a metaphor for pettiness or innumerable small things (such as bumps of a skin rash)
, jawawut 

Mandarin Chinese: su (粟). Also called xiǎomǐ (小米), which is the term commonly used for the grain after it has been husked (husks have been removed); unhusked grain is called guzi (穀子) in Northern China.
 or 

 or 
/
 or chumiza
 or 

 ( or )

Cultivation 
In India, foxtail millet is still an important crop in its arid and semi-arid regions. In South India, it has been a staple diet among people for a long time from the Sangam period. It is referred to often in old Tamil texts and is commonly associated with Lord Muruga and his consort Valli.

In China, foxtail millet is the most common millet and one of the main food crops, especially among the poor in the dry northern part of that country. In Southeast Asia, foxtail millet is commonly cultivated in its dry, upland regions. In Europe and North America it is planted at a moderate scale for hay and silage, and to a more limited extent for birdseed.

In the northern Philippines, foxtail millet was once an important staple crop, until its later replacement by wet-rice and sweet potato cultivation.

It is a warm season crop, typically planted in late spring. Its early maturity and efficient use of available water make it suitable for raising in dry areas.

Pests
Diseases of foxtail millet include leaf and head blast disease caused by Magnaporthe grisea, smut disease caused by Ustilago crameri, and green ear caused by Sclerospora graminicola. The unharvested crop is also susceptible to attack by birds and rodents. Insect pests include Atherigona atripalpis, the foxtail millet shoot fly.

Insects
Insect pests include:

shoot fly Atherigona atripalpis (major pest)
Atherigona approximata, Atherigona pulla, Atherigona punctata, and Atherigona biseta
cutworm Agrotis ipsilon
stem borer Chilo partellus
pink borer, Sesamia inferens
corn borer, Ostrinia furnacalis

Leaf feeders
armyworms, Mythimna separata, Spodoptera frugiperda, and Spodoptera litura
leaf-feeding caterpillars Amsacta albistriga, Amsacta moorei and Amsacta lactinea
ash weevil Myllocerus undecimpustulatus maculosus
leaf beetle Oulema melanopus
flea beetle Chaetocnema basalis
leaf folder Cnaphalocrocis medinalis
leaf roller Cnaphalocrocis patnalis
surface grasshopper Chrotogonus hemipterus
grasshopper Conocephalus maculatus

Earhead feeders
green bug Nezara viridula

Others
bugs, Cletus punctiger, Dolycoris indicus, and Nephotettix virescens
aphid Melanaphis sacchari
sugarcane leafhopper Pyrilla perpusilla

History and domestication
The wild antecedent of foxtail millet has been securely identified as Setaria viridis, which is interfertile with foxtail millet; wild or weedy forms of foxtail millet also exist. Zohary and Hopf note that the primary difference between the wild and cultivated forms is "their seed dispersal biology. Wild and weedy forms shatter their seed while the cultivars retain them."</ref> The reference genome for foxtail millet was completed in 2012. Genetic comparisons also confirm that S. viridis is the antecedent of S. italica.

The earliest evidence of the cultivation of this grain comes from the Peiligang culture of China, which also cultivated Panicum miliaceum, but foxtail millet became the predominant grain only with the Yangshao culture. More recently, the Cishan culture of China has been identified as the earliest to domesticate foxtail millet around 6500–5500 BC.

The earliest evidence for foxtail millet cultivation outside of its native distribution is at Chengtoushan in the Middle Yangtze River region, dating to around 4000 BC. In southern China, foxtail millet reached the Chengdu Plain (Baodun) at around 2700 BC and Guangxi (near the Vietnamese border) at around 3000 BC. Foxtail millet also reached Taiwan (Nankuanli, Dapenkeng culture) at around 2800 BC and the Tibetan Plateau (Karuo) at around 3000 BC.

Foxtail millet likely reached Southeast Asia via multiple routes. The earliest evidence for foxtail millet in Southeast Asia comes from various sites in the Khao Wong Prachan Valley in central Thailand, with the site at  providing the earliest date with direct AMS dating to around 2300 BC.

The earliest evidence for foxtail millet in East Siberia comes from the archaeological site at Krounovka 1 in Primorsky Krai, dating to around 3620–3370 BC. The earliest direct evidence for foxtail millet in Korea come from Dongsam-dong Shell Midden, a Jeulmun site in southern Korea, with a direct AMS date of around 3,360 BC. In Japan, the earliest evidence for foxtail millet comes from the Jōmon site at Usujiri in Hokkaido, dating to around 4,000 BP.

Foxtail millet arrived in Europe later; carbonized seeds first appear in the second millennium BC in central Europe. The earliest definite evidence for its cultivation in the Near East is at the Iron Age levels at Tille Hoyuk in Turkey, with an uncorrected radiocarbon date of about 600 BC.

Agronomic genetics
As with some other cereals the waxy gene contributes to glutinousness.

References

External links

Alternative Field Crops Manual: Millets
Siridhanya millets
粟の収穫 粟の脱穀 — "Harvest of foxtail millet" Gujō, Gifu, Japan

Millets
Setaria
Grasses of Asia
Plants described in 1753
Cereals